Ault is a commune in the Somme department in Hauts-de-France in northern France.

Geography
To the south of the town is a large wooded area, the ‘Bois de Cise’, in a valley that leads on to the coast. To the north, the cliffs descend to the level of the beach at Onival. The area around the town, the 'hâble d’Ault' was mostly tidal marshland that has been reclaimed from the sea. Cattle, sheep and game are raised here.

Railways
Ault had a station on the standard gauge Woincourt to Onival line, which closed to passengers in May 1939, but saw much use during World War II  to move materials for the Atlantic Wall. During  the war, a metre gauge line was laid alongside the road from Lanchères, on the CFBS, to Ault. This line was dismantled after the war.

Population

Places of interest
 The 15th / sixteenth century church of Saint-Pierre,
 The war memorial, designed by Paul Landowski.
 Two chapels, at Onival and Bois de Cise dating from the nineteenth century.
 Several ancient village houses.
 The lighthouse, with its lantern over 106 metres above sea-level.
 The cliffs
 The beaches of Ault and Bois de Cise..
 The ‘hâble d'Ault', with signed pathways.

Sea defences
The town has paid a heavy price defending itself against the sea, which is constantly washing away the beach, cliffs and public spaces, such as the car parks and gardens. The problem is ongoing. A "balcony on the sea", a huge concrete construction has been built but the risks remain. Signs of wear of the dyke under the casino have been noted.

See also
Communes of the Somme department

References

External links

 Official website 
 Statistical data, INSEE

Communes of Somme (department)